José Enrique Gutiérrez Cardona (27 February 1939 - 30 January 2013), more commonly known as Cardona or Indio Cardona or Coneja Cardona, was a professional footballer.

Early career
Cardona was born in La Lima, Honduras.  In 1957 he was National Football Champion and Top Scorer. A year later, he was transferred to Portuguese club Lusitano.

In 1959 he was acquired by Valencia CF but because it had reached its maximum allowance of foreign players, Cardona was lent to Spanish club Elche, who a year later was promoted to the top flight of the Spanish League for the first time in their history.  He made his debut on September 13, 1959 against Real Oviedo, and stayed for 5 seasons, playing 89 games and scoring 24 goals in the first division.

In the season 1959, Cardona was the top scorer in the Spanish second division with 22 goals (the same number of goals made by first division top scorer Alfredo Di Stéfano that season).

In 1964 he transferred to Atlético Madrid, who that season came second in the league championship and won the Copa del Generalísimo (now known as La Copa del Rey). Cardona scoring the winning goal in the final against Real Zaragoza. The following year he played 10 times in Atlético's championship-winning season.

Cardona, playing with Valencia C.F., scored the first goal in the first nightly game in the Estadio Azteca in Mexico City against Necaxa on June 5, 1966. The final score was 3-1 in favor of Valencia C.F.

International career
Cardona played internationally with Honduras, but never qualified for a World Cup finals. He represented his country in 3 FIFA World Cup qualification matches.

Later life
Cardona retired at the end of the 1968–69 season, by which time he had played a total of 141 games in the Primera División, scoring 44 goals.  He died, aged 73, in San Pedro Sula, Honduras, of a heart attack.

Honours and awards

Club
Elche
 Segunda Division: 1958-59
Atlético Madrid
 La Liga: 1965–66, 1969–70
 Copa del Generalísimo: 1964–65

References

External links
 
 España le hace un homenaje a la Coneja Cardona - El Heraldo 

1939 births
2013 deaths
People from Cortés Department
Association football forwards
Honduran footballers
Honduras international footballers
Elche CF players
Atlético Madrid footballers
Real C.D. España players
Liga Nacional de Fútbol Profesional de Honduras players
Primeira Liga players
La Liga players
Honduran expatriate footballers
Expatriate footballers in Portugal
Expatriate footballers in Spain
Honduran expatriate sportspeople in Spain